The CMLL World Welterweight Championship (Campeonato Mundial de Peso Welter CMLL in Spanish) is a professional wrestling world championship promoted by the Mexican Lucha Libre wrestling-based promotion Consejo Mundial de Lucha Libre (CMLL) since 1992. As it is a professional wrestling championship, it is not won legitimately; it is instead won via a scripted ending to a match or awarded to a wrestler because of a storyline. Because Lucha Libre emphasizes the lower weight classes, this division is considered more important than the normally more prestigious heavyweight division of a promotion. All title matches take place under two out of three falls rules.

The first champion to be recognized by CMLL was Fuerza Guerrera, who defeated El Khalifa in the finals of a four-man tournament that took place on February 15, 1992. In addition to being the first champion, Fuerza Guerrera is the individual to have held the championship the shortest time, at 22 days. Mephisto holds the record for the longest individual title reign, at 1,141 days, as well as the longest combined reign, 2,191 days in total. Titán is the current champion; he is on his first reign as CMLL World Welterweight Champion and is the 34th overall champion. He defeated Soberano Jr. on December 8, 2019, to win the title. In 1996, then reigning champion El Pantera planned on leaving CMLL to join their main rival AAA; before doing so he lost the CMLL Welterweight Title to Super Delfin in a match not sanctioned by CMLL. As CMLL knew that Pantera was leaving they used the opportunity to vacate the title, stating that Super Delfin's claim to the title was void. After El Felino became the CMLL-endorsed champion, he defeated Super Delfin to ensure that there was only one undisputed CMLL World Welterweight Champion.

Title history

Combined reigns

Footnotes

References

General source
[G] - 
Specific

External links
CMLL World Welterweight Championship at Solie.org
CMLL World Welterweight Championship at Wrestling-titles.com
CMLL World Welterweight Championship at Cagematch.net

Consejo Mundial de Lucha Libre championships
CMLL World Welterweight Championship
Welterweight wrestling championships